The Magdalena antbird (Sipia palliata) is a species of bird in the family Thamnophilidae. It is found in Colombia and Venezuela. Its natural habitats are subtropical or tropical moist lowland forests and subtropical or tropical moist montane forests.

The Magdalena antbird was described in 1917 by the American ornithologist W. E. Clyde Todd as a subspecies of the dull-mantled antbird and given the trinomial name Myrmeciza laemosticta palliata. Based on the results of a study of the vocal characteristics and mitochondrial DNA published in 2010, the Magdalena antbird was promoted to species status. A molecular phylogenetic study published in 2013 found that the genus Myrmeciza, as then defined, was polyphyletic. In the resulting rearrangement to create monophyletic genera the Magdalena antbird was moved to a resurrected genus Sipia that had been introduced by the Austrian ornithologist Carl Eduard Hellmayr in 1924.

References

Álvarez, M., V. Caro, O. Laverde & A. M. Cuervo. 2007. Guía Sonora de las Aves de los Andes Colombianos. Instituto Alexander von Humboldt & Cornell Laboratory of Ornithology.

Magdalena antbird
Birds of the Colombian Andes
Birds of the Venezuelan Andes
Birds of the Tumbes-Chocó-Magdalena
Magdalena antbird
Magdalena antbird